KSR-I (Korean Sounding Rocket-I) is South Korean sounding rocket designed by KARI.

Spec 
 Payload: 150 kg
 Apogee: 75 km
 Thrust: 86 kN
 Weight: 1200 kg
 Diameter: 0.42 m
 Length: 6.7 m
 Launch: June 4, 1993 (1st)/September 1, 1993 (2nd)

See also 
 KARI KSR-2
 KARI KSR-3
 KSLV-I
 KSLV-II

References

External links 
 KSR-I en Encyclopedia Astronautica

Sounding rockets of South Korea